Raju Guldai (born 12 December 1998) is an Indian professional footballer. He played as a forward for Mumbai City in the Indian Super League.

Career

Egypt 
Born in Mumbai, Maharashrtra, Guldai was scouted by Egyptian club Misr Lel-Makkasa SC Football Academy in 2013 during a talent search, while playing for Mumbay City in a tournament in Japan. He moved to Egypt with his father and played for the Faiyum club for 2 years, before returning to Mumbai due to his father's foreign registration issues in the middle east.

Mumbai City 
In 2015, Guldai took part in the "Kick for tolerance" tournament, organized by Jungle Crow foundation.
In 2016, Guldai was selected to join the Mumbai City first team, and on 3 December 2016 he made his first and only appearance, as a substitute in the 0-0 draw vs Delhi Dynamos. At the end of the 2016 season, Guldai was released from the club.

International 
During 2016 Guldai was part of India's U19 squad.

References 

Mumbai City FC players
Living people
1998 births
Footballers from Mumbai
Association football forwards
Indian footballers